Marwan Al-Haidari (born 12 April 1996) is a Saudi professional footballer who plays as a goalkeeper for Pro League club Al-Khaleej.

Career
Al-Haidari started his career with Al-Nahda. On 21 November 2015, Al-Haidari signed a 4-year contract with Pro League club Al-Hilal. On 2 July 2019, Al-Haidari signed a 4-year contract with Pro League club Al-Shabab. On 30 August 2021, Al-Haidari joined Al-Fayha on loan. On 9 August 2022, Al-Hadari joined Al-Khaleej on a two-year deal following his release from Al-Shabab.

Honours
Al-Hilal
Saudi Professional League: 2016–17, 2017–18
King Cup: 2017
Crown Prince Cup: 2015–16

Al-Fayha
King Cup: 2021–22

References

External links 
 

1996 births
Living people
Saudi Arabian footballers
Saudi Arabia youth international footballers
Al-Nahda Club (Saudi Arabia) players
Al Hilal SFC players
Al-Shabab FC (Riyadh) players
Al-Fayha FC players
Khaleej FC players
Association football goalkeepers
Saudi First Division League players
Saudi Professional League players